The Libertarian Party of Washington (LPWA) is the state-affiliate of the national Libertarian Party in the state of Washington, the third-largest political party in the state and country.

The party advocates for constitutionally restricted government and significant cuts to government spending and taxation. The party also supports protecting natural rights and expanding civil rights, including sexual and racial equality, LGBT rights, and decriminalization of scheduled drugs and prostitution. In addition, the party also supports school choice, privatizing the ferry system and portions of the state highways, eliminating predatory speed-traps, allowing private investment in water and natural resources, and supporting investment in industrial hemp. The Libertarian Party of Washington operates under a non-aggression pact.

Libertarians align across the political spectrum, but generally advocate against statist practices. Libertarian political affiliation is best understood by the Nolan chart, rather than the standard left/right paradigm.

Statement of Principles 

The Libertarian Party of Washington State describes its principles as follows: We, the members of the Libertarian Party of Washington State, hold these truths to be self-evident, that all men and women are created equal, that they are endowed with certain unalienable Rights, that among these are Life, Liberty, and the pursuit of Happiness. Accordingly, all individuals have the right to exercise sole dominion over their lives, and have the right to live in whatever manner they choose, so long as they do not forcibly interfere with the equal right of others to live in whatever manner they choose.

We further hold that where government exists, it must not violate the right of any individual: namely (1) the right to life – accordingly, we support the prohibition of the initiation of physical force against others; (2) the right to liberty of speech and action – accordingly we oppose all attempts by the government to abridge the freedom of speech and the press, as well as government censorship in any form; and (3) the right to property – accordingly, we oppose all government interference with private property, such as confiscation, nationalization, and eminent domain, and support the prohibition of robbery, trespass, fraud, and misrepresentation.

Since governments, when instituted, must not violate individual rights, we oppose all interference by government in the areas of voluntary and contractual relations among individuals. People should not be forced to sacrifice their lives or property for the benefit of others. They should be left free by the government to deal with one another as free traders; and the resultant economic system, the only one compatible with the protection of individual rights, is the free market.

History of the Libertarian Party in Washington State
In 2000, the Libertarian Party attained major party status in Washington after the success of Libertarian candidates in statewide races, many of whom received the required 5% of the total statewide vote.  The party ran 43 candidates for state legislative seats, 12 of whom received 20% or more of the total votes in their race, 8 candidates for Congress, one candidate for US Senate, and Harry Brown/Art Olivier for President/Vice-President.

By the 2004 election all statewide Libertarian candidates failed to reach 5% of the statewide vote.  Ruth Bennett, in the race for Governor, finished the third recount with 63,464 (2.3%) of the statewide total. The party ran 3 Congressional candidates and one US Senate candidate, none of whom received higher than 2.5% of the total votes in their respective races.  Twenty-five state legislative candidates ran under the Libertarian banner, with one receiving above 10% total votes, and with an average result below 4%.

In 2006, the Libertarian Party nominated Bruce Guthrie for US Senate, who mortgaged his home to raise $1.2 million in order to qualify for the Seattle debates. The Seattle PI stated the Guthrie won the debate 'just by being there', as he had the opportunity to share his platform with a wide audience, a feat not many third party candidates get to achieve.  Guthrie finished the race with 29,331 total votes, representing 1.4% of the statewide total.  No state legislative positions were contested by the Libertarian Party as a demoralizing result of the Blanket Primary law passed through the legislature by the two major parties, and supported by the voters as Initiative 872 with 59% approval.  This effectively ended the success of a strong third party in Washington State.

In the 2008 elections, two Libertarian Party candidates qualified for the August 19 primary – John Beck for U.S. Congress (5th C.D.) and Ruth Bennett for State Representative (37th Legislative District, Position 2). John Beck failed to survive the new Top Two Primary, while Ruth Bennett went on to receive only 10.5% of the votes in a head-to-head run against incumbent Democrat Eric Pettigrew.  Bennett made a final statement on the inability for third party success under the new election laws, stating that the only way a Libertarian can survive is in otherwise uncontested entrenched districts.  She cited her landslide loss as evidence.

After the passage of Initiative 872, instituting a Top Two General Election, and the 2008 US Supreme Court ruling to uphold the Initiative, the party reduced in rank and status across the state.  From 2009 through 2013, the party loosely lobbied major party officials for proposed or supported legislation.  No Libertarian appeared on the ballot in the 2010 elections.  By 2011, there was little interest for remaining party members to hold a state convention, during a year in which officers would have been elected.  A small group of individuals banded together for the purpose of electing officers at an abbreviated one day session in Olympia.  Party affiliation waned and records of Party members became dated with little to no significant achievements of note.

In 2012 the only Libertarian on the ballot was Gary Johnson for US president, who finished with 42,202 (1.4%) of the statewide total.

In 2014, the Party leadership lost all seats during the annual convention during a mounted effort to ratify the party constitution and bylaws.  The effort originated from party officer's supporting efforts of candidates from competing political parties.  The ratification of the new rules was led by a slate of candidates and their volunteers whose intended purpose was to rebuild a permanent presence in Washington State politics and ready the party for a 2016 return to major party status.  The most significant changes to the party rules allowed for the annual election of officers and a restructure of the board to include regional directors.  The move called for the immediate dismissal of the chairman and moved directly into voting for replacement officers. The new officers immediately decentralized the power structure to a series of pre-defined regions in order to aid ongoing campaigns and recruit for county-level political leadership.

By the 2016 state convention party leadership had recruited and vetted 32 candidates for state and local offices for the primary elections. The Libertarian Party of Washington sent a full delegation to National Convention and has been widely recognized as one of the most active and successful state affiliates in America.

Following a significantly damaging position by the Secretary of State, Kim Wyman, to include with statewide vote totals for president unsubstantiated write-ins, the Libertarian Party received only 4.98% of the total statewide vote for president, falling shy of the necessary 5.00% to achieve major party status through 2020. Despite the most successful presidential effort in Washington State for the party, leadership and membership fell into odds resulting in the resignation of the entire executive slate. The spring 2017 state convention elected new leadership and reversed significant constitution and bylaws changes implemented in 2014.

2012 Elections
The Libertarian Party of Washington State had no approved candidates for any state offices.  The only libertarian candidate on the general election ballot in the state was Gary Johnson/Jim Gray for President/Vice President.

Members of the Libertarian Party were heavily involved with the legalization of marijuana, under Initiative 502, and the legalization of same-sex marriage, under Referendum 74.  Though the party heavily endorsed these initiatives, they offered no specific legislation to the people, citing a lack of funds and infrastructure.

2014 Elections
In 2014, The Libertarian Party of Washington State identified a growing trend of dissatisfaction with the two major political parties and put into practice a plan directed at the Washington State Top Two Primary system, called the Rise of the Libertarian.  The intent of the plan was to challenge as many races as possible in the state, pushing as many candidates into a head-to-head competition against major party candidates, attempting to capture the momentum of the growing independent voter.  Libertarian campaigns uniformly aligned on a pledge to accept only private donations, returning all union or corporate donations.  The Libertarian Party of Washington recruited 12 candidates to run for the Washington State Legislature. Of the 12 candidates, 8 proceeded through Washington's Top Two Primary into the General Election.  Four Libertarian candidates failed to finish in the top-two and were eliminated from the General Election run-off. Steven Nielson was the first Libertarian candidate to succeed in advancing through a contested primary following the passage of Initiative 872 in 2004.

Statewide turnout for the 2014 Primary Election was 31.2%.

Statewide turnout for the 2014 General Election was 54.1%.  Nationwide, this was the lowest voter turnout since World War II.

Despite losses in all eight general election races the Libertarian Party analysis of the results was favorable.  The average performance of the candidates in the state far surpassed the national average of 4.65% for Libertarian candidates, and reflected performances in similar head-to-head races, such as Lucas Overby (FL).  The party claimed over 81,000 votes, a presence on par with the previous height of the Libertarian Party of Washington State in 2000.

2015 Initiatives
Leaders within the Libertarian Party of Washington State drafted a series of initiatives which they intended to petition onto the 2015 general election ballot.  Successful petitioning required 325,000 signatures to be delivered to the Secretary of State.  The Initiatives garnered some attention and mild support, but were not successful in gaining ballot access.  The party estimated less than 10,000 signatures were gathered.

The 'Make Every Vote Count Washington' initiative 1380, took aim at the Washington State Electoral College laws.  In 2009, Washington State entered into the National Popular Vote Interstate Compact which would award the Presidential Electors from the state according to the results of the national popular vote.  The NPVIC does not go into effect until a 270 Electoral Vote majority of states joins the compact.  The proposed initiative would have withdrawn Washington from the compact and replaced the current 'Winner Take All' statewide system with a split electorate representing the State's congressional districts.

2015 Elections
Rebranding and gains made in the 2014 election cycle provided momentum to candidates in local races in the 2015 election cycle.  The party recruited and ran 14 candidates across the state in local non-partisan races.  Due to revised Washington State laws only contested primary races with more than two candidates would be presented on the primary ballots, and thus only contested races with Libertarian candidates were able to gauge the success of the party growth since the 2014 elections.  Of those contested races three Libertarian candidates succeeded in defeating opponents in the blanket primary and won access onto the general election ballot.

2016 Elections
Statewide races and US presidential contests increased the popularity of the Libertarian Party. Washington State qualified with the other states to gain presidential ballot access.  32 candidates were successful in gaining ballot access for the Washington State Primary. The party endorsed and run a slate of candidates for statewide offices for the first time since 2004. Six candidates qualified for statewide ballots in the primary.

Joshua Trumbull finished the Blanket Primary receiving more votes than any Libertarian candidate in the history of the Libertarian Party in Washington State.  His name and that of the presidential nominee was the only Libertarian candidate represented across the state in the November General Election. Ten Libertarian legislative candidates qualified for the November ballot by running in two-way races.  No Libertarian candidates survived a contested primary in 2016.

Current Leadership of LPWA

Executive committee

Regional Representatives 

 Region 1: Representing Island, Skagit, San Juan, and Whatcom Counties
 Representative: Jacob Lamont     
Alternate: Larry Nicholas
 Region 2: Representing King and Snohomish Counties  
 Representative: Michelle Darnell     
Alternate: Layla Bush
 Region 3: Representing Clallam, Jefferson, Mason, and Kitsap Counties  
 Representative: Bill Johnson    
Alternate: Raylene Lightheart
 Region 4: Representing Grays Harbor, Lewis, Pierce, and Thurston Counties  
 Representative: Josh Cupps    
Alternate: Open
 Region 5: Representing Clark, Cowlitz, Pacific, Skamina, and Wahkiakum Counties  
 Representative: Open     
Alternate: Ralph Edwards
 Region 6: Representing Chelan, Douglas, Grant, Klickitat, Kittitas, Okanogan, and Yakima Counties  
 Representative: Sonny Patterson     
Alternate: Shannon (Sam) McCutcheon
 Region 7: Representing Adams, Ferry, Lincoln, Pend Oreille, Spokane, and Stevens Counties  
 Representative: Open
Alternate: Open
 Region 8: Representing Asotin, Benton, Columbia, Garfield, Franklin, Walla Walla and Whitman Counties   
 Representative: Ryan Whitten     
Alternate: Open

Elected / Appointed Officials

County parties 

 Adams County - 
 Asotin County -
 Benton County -
 Chelan County -
 Clallam County -
 Clark County -  
 Columbia County - 
 Cowlitz County - 
 Douglas County -
 Ferry County -
 Franklin County - 
 Garfield County - 
 Grant -
 Grays Harbor - 
 Island County -
 Jefferson County - 
 King County - Official Website/Facebook
 Kitsap County - Facebook 
 Kittitas County -
 Klickitat County - 
 Lewis County - 
 Lincoln County - 
 Mason County - 
 Okanogan County - 
 Pacific County - 
 Pend Oreille County - 
 Pierce County -
 San Juan County -
 Skagit County
 Skamania County  
 Snohomish County - Facebook
 Spokane County - 
 Stevens County - 
 Thurston County - 
 Wahkiakum County - 
 Walla Walla County -
 Whatcom County - 
 Whitman County - 
 Yakima -

Detailed electoral performance

Presidential

References

External links
 Official Website
 Official Facebook Page

Washington
Political parties in Washington (state)